Louis Marshall (Fauquier County, Virginia, 7 October 1773 – Buckpond, Kentucky, April 1866) was a United States educator.

Biography
He was the son of Thomas Marshall, and brother of U.S. Chief Justice John Marshall. He was educated at home, studied medicine in Edinburgh, and spent several years in Paris, participating in the attack upon the Bastille. He was arrested during the Reign of Terror and condemned to death, but was rescued by the intervention of his elder brothers. He attained note as a physician, but his taste for literature and languages caused him to abandon his profession, and he then established an academy in Woodford County, Kentucky. He was president of Washington College, Virginia, in 1838, and afterward of Transylvania University, Kentucky. He died in Woodford County, Kentucky, in 1866, one year after the end of the American Civil War.

Family
His sons Thomas Francis Marshall, Edward C. Marshall and Alexander Keith Marshall all served single terms in the United States House of Representatives at various times and representing different districts.

Notes

References

1773 births
1866 deaths
19th-century American physicians
Heads of universities and colleges in the United States
People of the French Revolution
Louis
Alumni of the University of Edinburgh